Argyria was a town located in the ancient Troad on the right bank of the Aesepus River (modern Gönen Çay) near Scepsis. It was noted for its silver mines, whence the town's name (άργυρος is Greek for 'silver'). Strabo further clarifies its location as at the foot of Mount Ida near the source of the Aesepus.

Its site is located near Karaidin Maden (Gümüş Maden) in Asiatic Turkey.

References

Populated places in ancient Troad
Former populated places in Turkey